Thomas Snelling (1712 – 2 May 1773) was an English numismatist.

Life
He carried on business as a coin dealer and bookseller at No. 163 Fleet Street, next the Horn Tavern (now Anderton's Hotel). His name often occurs as a purchaser at London coin-sales about 1766, and among his numismatic customers was William Hunter the anatomist.

He died on 2 May 1773, and his son, Thomas Snelling, carried on business as a printseller at 163 Fleet Street, and published posthumously two of his father's works.

Snelling's coins, medals, and antiques were sold by auction at Langford's, Covent Garden, 21–24 Jan. 1774 (Priced Sale Catalogue in Medal Room, Brit. Mus.). The coins were principally Greek and Roman, but none of the lots fetched high prices.

There are three portrait medals of Snelling in the British Museum, by G. Rawle, L. Pingo, and Kirk (Durand, Médailles et Jetons de Numismates, p. 190). A portrait of him was drawn and engraved by John Thane, 1770, and William Tassie made a medallion of him (Gray, Tassie, p. 147). There is also a medallion in the Tassie series (ib.) of his daughter, Miss Snelling.

Works
Snelling wrote and published many treatises on British coins. The plates of his View of the Silver Coin … of England are coarsely executed, but Edward Hawkins (Silver Coins) praised them for their fidelity. On the title-pages and plates of his books Snelling usually inserted the advertisement: "Who buys and sells all sorts of coins and medals."

Snelling's works are as follows: 
 Seventy-two Plates of Gold and Silver Coin, mostly English, 1757. Henry William Henfrey (Num. Chron. 1874, pp. 159 f.) has shown that these were probably printed from copperplates, engraved for Sir James Harrington and the committee of the mint in 1652.
 A View of the Silver Coin … of England, 1762.
 A View of the Gold Coin … of England, 1763.
 A View of the Copper Coin … of England, 1766 (includes the tradesmen's tokens).
 A View of the COINS at this time current throughout Europe.... , 1766 .
 The Doctrine of Gold and Silver Computations, 1766. 
 A Supplement to Mr. Simon's Essay on Irish Coins, 1767.
 Miscellaneous Views of the Coins struck by English Princes in France, &c., 1769 (includes an account of counterfeit sterlings, and of English colonial and pattern coins).
 A View of the Origin … of Jettons or Counters, 1769.
 A View of the Silver Coin of … Scotland, 1774.
 Thirty-three Plates of English Medals, 1776.

References

1712 births
1773 deaths
English numismatists
British booksellers